The Jänijõgi is a river in the Kõrvemaa region of Estonia.

The upper reaches are wooded. The river passes through the village of Jäneda. Records going back to 1591 indicate that the Jäneda mill on the river was in existence by then.

The Tarvasjõgi is a tributary of the Jänijõgi.

References

Rivers of Estonia